The 2007 Campeonato Nacional Apertura Copa Banco Estado  was the 82nd Chilean League top flight tournament, in which Colo-Colo won its 27th league title.

First stage

Group 1

Group 2

Group 3

Group 4

Playoff match

A playoff round was contested because there was a third-placed team who had more points than a second placed team. In a playoff round the third-placed team would have the home field advantage.

Playoff stage

Top goalscorers

Relegation

Relegation table

Relegation/promotion playoffs

Notes and references

External links
 RSSSF Chile 2007

Primera División de Chile seasons
Chile
2007 in Chilean football